South Korea competed at the 1968 Summer Paralympics in Tel Aviv, Israel. They were the third paralympics to be held and were originally meant to take place alongside the 1968 Summer Olympics in Mexico City, Mexico. However, in 1966 the Mexican government decided against it due to difficulties.

Archery

Athletics

Table tennis

References

 IPC

Nations at the 1968 Summer Paralympics
1968
Paralympics